The Men's Malaysian Open Squash Championships 2011 is the men's edition of the 2011 Malaysian Open Squash Championships, which is a tournament of the PSA World Tour event International, an event offering a prize of $50,000. The event took place in Kuala Lumpur in Malaysia from 20 July to 23 July. Grégory Gaultier won his first Malaysian Open trophy, beating Aamir Atlas Khan in the final.

Prize money and ranking points
For 2011, the prize purse is $50,000. The prize money and points breakdown is as follows:

Seeds

Draw and results

See also
PSA World Tour 2011
Malaysian Open Squash Championships
Women's Malaysian Open Squash Championships 2011

References

External links
PSA Malaysian Open Squash Championships 2011 website
Malaysian Open Squash Championships 2011 Squashsite website

Squash tournaments in Malaysia
Malaysian Open Squash Championships
2011 in Malaysian sport